Yin Anna (born 23 March 1992 in Shandong) is a Chinese long-distance runner who specializes in the 3000 metres steeplechase.

Doping
Yin Anna tested positive for EPO on 7 September 2014, and was subsequently handed a two-year ban from sport.

See also
China at the 2012 Summer Olympics - Athletics
Athletics at the 2012 Summer Olympics – Women's 3000 metres steeplechase

References

External links

1992 births
Living people
Doping cases in athletics
Chinese female long-distance runners
Chinese sportspeople in doping cases
Runners from Shandong
Athletes (track and field) at the 2012 Summer Olympics
Olympic athletes of China
Chinese female steeplechase runners